Wesley H. Smith is the Bjorn Wiik Professor of Physics at the University of Wisconsin–Madison where he has taught since 1988.  Before that he taught at Columbia University.

Along with fellow physics professor Sau Lan Wu and math professor Terry Millar, he was “was central to Wisconsin’s contribution to development of the Large Hadron Collider.”

Education
Harvard University Physics A.B/A.M. 1976
University of California, Berkeley Physics Ph.D. 1981
Columbia University High Energy Physics Post Doc 1981-1982

Awards and honors
 2020 W.K.H. Panofsky Prize in Experimental Particle Physics Recipient

References

External links
All published papers

University of Wisconsin–Madison faculty
Columbia University faculty
Harvard College alumni
University of California, Berkeley alumni
American physicists
Living people
Year of birth missing (living people)